Gadson is both a surname. Notable people with the name include:

George Gadson (born 1953), American artist
Gregory D. Gadson (born 1966), American actor, motivational speaker, and army officer
James Gadson (born 1939), American musician
Jeannette Gadson (1945–2007), New York politician